"The Smoke" is a song by the English rock band the Smile. It was released on 27 January 2022 as the second single from their debut album, A Light for Attracting Attention.

Reception
Both Uproxx and The Fader noted the song was more in line with Thom Yorke and Jonny Greenwood's main band Radiohead's later work than the Smile's previous single, "You Will Never Work in Television Again", with Uproxx calling the song "a groove-driven single". Earmilk favorably compared the sound to that of a demo by the Doors or Dizzy Gillespie from the early 1970's, while Resident Advisor compared it to the sound of Fela Kuti. Uncrate said Tom Skinner's drumming "showcases some funk/jazz-infused stylings".

Music video
The video for "The Smoke" was shot on 16 mm film and directed by BAFTA Award-winning writer and director Mark Jenkin. Rob Ulitski of Promonews said Jenkin's video "doesn't conform to traditional narrative or promo logic, existing instead as a conceptual form to accompany the music." Raphael Helfand of The Fader called the video "a loose interpretation of a 'lyric video'" with "largely unintelligible" words.

Remix
An official remix of the song by Dennis Bovell was released by the band on 3 March 2022. Greenwood told The Quietus, "Dennis' work runs like a thread through so much of the music I love. I'm more proud than I can say that he's done a dub mix of our song 'The Smoke'."

Personnel
Credits adapted from album liner notes.

The Smile
Thom Yorke – vocals, bass
Jonny Greenwood – guitar
Tom Skinner – drums

Production
Nigel Godrich

References

The Smile songs
2022 songs
Songs written by Jonny Greenwood
Songs written by Thom Yorke